Christopher Sandford (born 1 July 1956) is an English journalist and biographer. He primarily writes about film and music, as well as cricket, his sport of preference.

Life and career
Sandford was born in England, the son of Sefton Sandford, a senior British naval officer. He spent his childhood partly in the Soviet Union, where his father served as senior military attaché in the British Embassy, and partly in the United Kingdom. He was educated at Radley College and Fitzwilliam College, Cambridge, where he obtained a master's degree in history in 1977. He began his career as a journalist in London that same year.

He lives in Seattle and London. Apart from his biographies, histories, novels and other books, he has written prolifically for newspapers and magazines in the US and the UK. His book The Final Innings: The Cricketers of Summer 1939 was joint winner of The Cricket Society/MCC Book of the Year award for 2020.

Books

The Cornhill Centenary Test 1981
Feasting with Panthers 1983 (novel)
Arcadian 1985 (novel)
We Don't Do Dogs 1988 (novel)
Godfrey Evans: A Biography 1990
Tom Graveney: The Biography 1992
Mick Jagger: Primitive Cool 1994
Bowie: Loving the Alien 1998
Sting: Demolition Man 1998
Springsteen: Point Blank 1999
Clapton: Edge of Darkness 1999
McQueen: The Biography 2001
Keith Richards: Satisfaction 2004
Paul McCartney 2006
Imran Khan: The Cricketer, the Celebrity, the Politician 2009
Polanski: A Biography 2009
Masters of Mystery: The Strange Friendship of Arthur Conan Doyle and Harry Houdini 2011
The Rolling Stones: Fifty Years 2012
Kurt Cobain 2013
The Final Over: The Cricketers of Summer 1914 2015
Harold and Jack: The Remarkable Friendship of Prime Minister Macmillan and President Kennedy 2015
Mick Jagger: Rebel Knight 2016
The Man Who Would Be Sherlock: The Real Life Adventures of Arthur Conan Doyle 2017
Union Jack: John F. Kennedy's Special Relationship with Great Britain 2018
Zeebrugge: The Greatest Raid of All 2018
The Final Innings: The Cricketers of Summer 1939 2019
Keeper of Style: John Murray: The King of Lord's 2019
Victor Lustig: The Man Who Conned the World 2021
Laker and Lock: The Story of Cricket's "Spin Twins" 2022

References

1956 births
Living people
People educated at Radley College
Alumni of Fitzwilliam College, Cambridge
English journalists
Cricket historians and writers
English biographers